Ramoplanin (INN) is a glycolipodepsipeptide antibiotic drug derived from strain ATCC 33076 of Actinoplanes.  It is effective against Gram-positive bacteria.

Mechanism 
It exerts its bacteriocidal effect by inhibiting cell wall biosynthesis, acting by inhibiting the transglycosylation step of peptidoglycan synthesis.  Ramoplanin specifically binds to and sequesters lipid intermediates I and II, preventing intracellular glycosyltransferase (MurG) and other steps of the peptidoglycan assembly system.

Uses 
Its development has been fast-tracked by the U.S. Food and Drug Administration as a treatment for multiple antibiotic-resistant Clostridium difficile infection of the gastrointestinal tract, Unlike vancomycin, it is absorbed in the gastrointestinal tract, although it is unstable in the bloodstream, so can be taken only orally against Clostridium difficile infections of the gastrointestinal tract.

Ramoplanin is "particularly useful" in cases E. faecalis no matter its sensitivity to vancomycin.

Chemistry 
Rapoplanin is a mixture of three related compounds that vary in the acyl group on the Asn N-terminus, with the most abundant form (shown in the infobox) being A2.

Synthesis

Biosynthesis 
The biosynthesis is performed by a 33-gene cluster containing nonribosomal peptide synthetase genes and supporting enzymes for amino acid and fatty acid synthesis, revealed by sequencing of the producer strain in 2002. Initial investigation into the functions of individual genes were conducted in 2012.

Total synthesis 
The general synthesis of Ramoplanin A1, A2 and A3 aglycons entails the preparation of residues 3-9 (heptapeptide 15), pentadepsipeptide 26 (residues 1, 2 and 15–17) along with pentapeptide 34 (residues 10–14), subsequent coupling, and cyclization to create the 49-membered aglycon core of the compound. The synthesis of Ramoplanin A2 aglycon and A3 aglycon are very similar to scheme 6, where ramoplanin A1 aglycon requires the corresponding acyl group and DMF, while ramoplanin A3 aglycon synthesis requires both , i-PrOH, and then treatment with the acyl group and DMF.

References 

Antibiotics